Nowogródek Voivodeship can refer to:
Nowogródek Voivodeship (1507–1795) in the Polish–Lithuanian Commonwealth
Nowogródek Voivodeship (1919–1939) in the Second Polish Republic